The 103rd Street station is a local station on the IND Eighth Avenue Line of the New York City Subway. Located at West 103rd Street and Central Park West on the Upper West Side, it is served by the B on weekdays, the C train at all times except nights, and the A train during late nights only.

History 
The station opened on September 10, 1932, as part of the city-operated Independent Subway System (IND)'s initial segment, the Eighth Avenue Line between Chambers Street and 207th Street. While the IRT Broadway–Seventh Avenue Line already provided parallel service, the new Eighth Avenue subway via Central Park West provided an alternative route.

Station layout

This underground station has two levels with northbound trains using the upper level and southbound trains using the lower one. Each level has one side platform to the west of two tracks.

Both platforms have no trim line, but name tablets read "103RD ST." in white sans-serif lettering on a midnight blue background and black border. Small black "103" signs with white numbering run along the tiles at regular intervals and directional signs in the same style are below the name tablets. Blue columns run along both platforms at regular intervals with every other one having the standard black station name plate in white numbering.

Within this station, the northbound express track descends to allow the northbound local to cross over it, before rising up at 110th Street, where the line becomes the standard four tracks side by side with the local tracks on the side and express tracks in the center.

The IRT Lenox Avenue Line passes underneath this station at the extreme north end on West 104th Street to Central Park North–110th Street. The line is not visible from the platforms. On the east side of Central Park West and West 104th Street, adjacent to Central Park, is an emergency exit enclosed in a small brick house for the IRT line, which passes underneath the station. From here the line curves northeast, running directly under Central Park's North Woods at this point.

Exit
This station has one fare control area at the center of the upper-level platform. A single staircase connects the two platforms before a turnstile bank leads to a token booth and one staircase going up to the northwest corner of West 103rd Street and Central Park West. The station is unique in that it has only one open staircase to street level.

Directional signs that have been covered indicate that there were two more fare control areas. One exit at the extreme south end had two staircases going to southwestern corner of West 102nd Street and Central Park West, and the other at the extreme north end had two that went to both western corners of West 104th Street. Further evidence of these exits' existences includes new tiling on both levels, and doorways that lead to converted storage spaces on the upper level. The fare control area with stairs to West 104th Street was closed by 1940 and possibly as early as November 1932 - just two months after the opening of the station - due to frequent vandalism.

References

External links 

 nycsubway.org – IND 8th Avenue: 103rd Street 
 Station Reporter – B Train
 Station Reporter – C Train
 The Subway Nut - 103rd Street Pictures 
 103rd Street entrance from Google Maps Street View
Uptown Platform from Google Maps Street View

IND Eighth Avenue Line stations
Eighth Avenue (Manhattan)
New York City Subway stations in Manhattan
Railway stations in the United States opened in 1932
Upper West Side
Central Park
1932 establishments in New York City